Simon I de Senlis (or Senliz, St. Liz, etc.), 1st Earl of Northampton and 2nd Earl of Huntingdon jure uxoris (died between 1111 and 1113; most likely 1111 as this is when his castle at Northampton passed to the crown) was a Norman nobleman.

In 1098 he was captured during the Vexin campaign of King William Rufus and was subsequently ransomed. He witnessed King Henry I’s Charter of Liberties issued at his coronation in 1100. He attested royal charters in England from 1100 to 1103, 1106 to 1107, and 1109 to 1111. Sometime in the period 1093–1100, he and his wife, Maud, founded the Priory of St Andrew's, Northampton. He witnessed a grant of King Henry I to Bath Abbey on 8 August 1111 at Bishop's Waltham, as the king was crossing to Normandy. Simon de Senlis subsequently went abroad and died at La Charité-sur-Loire, where he was buried in the new priory church. The date of his death is uncertain.

He built Northampton Castle, the town walls and one of the four remaining round churches in England, The Holy Sepulchre, Northampton.

Family
Simon was the third son of Laudri de Senlis, sire of Chantilly and Ermenonville (in Picardy), and his spouse, Ermengarde.

He married in or before 1090 Maud of Huntingdon, daughter of Waltheof, Earl of Northumbria, Northampton and Huntingdon and Judith of Lens, niece of William the Conqueror who had earlier refused to wed Simon and fled abroad to avoid her uncle's wrath. They had three children:
Simon II de Senlis, Earl of Huntingdon-Northampton,
Waltheof of Melrose, and
Maud de Senlis, who married (1st) Robert Fitz Richard (of the de Clare family), of Little Dunmow, Essex, had issue, then following his death married (2nd) Saer de Quincy, Lord of Long Buckby in Northamptonshire, and had issue:
Alice de Senlis (St. Liz) (the mother of Sir William of Huntingfield, Magna Carta surety), and
Robert de Quincy (d. ca. 1198), father of:
Saer de Quincy, 1st Earl of Winchester, and Magna Carta surety (d. 1219).

Following Simon's death, his widow, Maud, married (2nd) around Christmas 1113, David I nicknamed the Saint, who became King of Scots in 1124. David was recognized as Earl of Huntingdon to the exclusion of his step-son, Simon; the earldom of Northampton reverted to the crown. Maud, 2nd Countess of Huntingdon, the Queen of Scots, died in 1130/31.

In popular culture
He was featured in Alan Moore's book Voice of the Fire as the main character of the chapter "Limping to Jerusalem " and appears in Elizabeth Chadwick's novel The Winter Mantle (2003),

Notes

11th-century births
1110s deaths
Year of birth unknown
Year of death uncertain
11th-century English nobility
12th-century English nobility
Anglo-Normans
People from Northampton
Norman warriors
Earls of Northampton
Earls of Huntingdon (1065 creation)
William II of England